Bibipur is a village in Bakshi Ka Talab block of Lucknow district, Uttar Pradesh, India. As of 2011, its population is 1,996, in 335 households. It is the seat of a gram panchayat, which also includes the village of Chak Bibipur.

References 

Villages in Lucknow district